Nyuya (Ñüüye) is a rural locality (a selo), the administrative centre of and one of two settlements, in addition to Turukta, in Nyuysky Rural Okrug of Lensky District in the Sakha Republic, Russia. Its population as of the 2002 Census was 1,276.

Geography
Nyuya is located around 90 km south-east of the district centre Lensk, on the left bank of the Lena River at its confluence with its tributary the Nyuya.

Economy and infrastructure
Nyuya and the neighbouring village Turukta, 18 km downstream on the Lena, were timber production centres during the Soviet era.  The timber company was privatised in 1992, however it later went bankrupt.

The village has a river port.  Road access is only reliable in winter, when the frozen river allows a winter road to Lensk.

Climate

References

Notes

Sources
Official website of the Sakha Republic. Registry of the Administrative-Territorial Divisions of the Sakha Republic. Lensky District. 

Rural localities in Lensky District, Sakha Republic
Populated places on the Lena River